Needle in the Haystack (Portuguese: Agulha no Palheiro) is a 1953 Brazilian comedy film directed by Alex Viany.

Cast
 Carmélia Alves 
 Roberto Bataglin as Eduardo 
 Renée Brown 
 Waldomiro Costa 
 César Cruz 
 Jaudet Cury 
 Jackson De Souza as Baiano  
 Israel García 
 Zizinha Macedo 
 Savina Marques 
 Dóris Monteiro as Elisa  
 Augusta Moreira 
 Laís Nascimento 
 Carlos Nefa 
 Sara Nobre as D. Gisa  
 Helba Nogueira 
 Lucília Reis 
 Manoel Rocha 
 Fada Santoro as Mariana  
 Maurício Silva 
 Hélio Souto as José da Silva  
 Miguel Torres 
 Solano Trindade 
 Alex Viany

References

Bibliography
 Alberto Elena & Marina Díaz López. The Cinema of Latin America. Columbia University Press, 2013.

External links

1953 comedy films
1953 films
Brazilian comedy films
1950s Portuguese-language films
Brazilian black-and-white films